King Lucas is an adventure video game released on December 1, 2016, by Spanish developer DevilishGames. Players take on the role as knights to help find King Lucas' lost daughters. A castle will be built at random and it is the player's mission to find them inside. Upon every succession, the search gets more difficult - the area of the castle gets bigger and players will eventually have to search through a castle with over 1,000 rooms.

King Lucas comes in two gameplay modes: solo and multiplayer. In the multiplayer mode, players compete to be the first one to locate the missing princess.

The game is available in three languages: English, Spanish, Russian.

References

2016 video games
Linux games
MacOS games
Video games developed in Spain
Windows games